Emma Booth may refer to:
 Emma Booth (actress) (born c. 1982), Australian model-turned-actress
 Emma Booth (equestrian) (born 1991), Australian Para-equestrian rider
 Emma Booth (The Salvation Army) (1860–1903), fourth child of William and Catherine Booth
 Emma (Welsh singer) (born 1974), Welsh singer, born Emma Louise Booth
 Emma Scarr Booth (1835–1927), British-born American author